Trockener Steg is a minor prominence in the area between the Matterhorn and the Breithorn, south of Zermatt in the canton of Valais.

A cable car station lies on the summit and gives access to the Klein Matterhorn.

References

External links
 Trockener Steg on Hikr

Mountains of the Alps
Mountains of Valais
Mountains of Switzerland
Two-thousanders of Switzerland